Montenegro competed at the 2018 European Athletics Championships in Berlin, Germany, between 7 and 12 August 2018. 2 men and 2 women competed in 4 events.

Results 

 Men 
Field events

Combined events – Decathlon

Women
Field events

References

European Athletics Championships
2018
Nations at the 2018 European Athletics Championships